Michaela Kirchgasser (born 18 March 1985) is a retired Austrian alpine ski racer. She raced in the technical events of slalom and giant slalom, and also the combined.

Career
On 25 November 2006, Kirchgasser made her first World Cup podium with a third place in the giant slalom at Aspen, Colorado.  Her first victory was on 24 February 2007, in a giant slalom at Sierra Nevada, Spain.

She has competed in three Olympics and six World Championships.  At the 2006 Winter Olympics, she finished fifth in the slalom and sixth in the combined, but failed to finish in the giant slalom.  At the 2007 World Championships she won the gold medal with the Austrian team in the team event, and finished fourth in the giant slalom and ninth in the slalom. She took a total of seven World Championship medals during her career.

Kirchgasser attained her first World Cup podium in slalom in January 2012 at Zagreb, Croatia. Less than three weeks later, she won her first World Cup slalom at Kranjska Gora, Slovenia. Kirchgasser won again in the slalom at the World Cup finals in Schladming to finish second in the slalom season standings, runner-up to compatriot Marlies Schild.

She retired from competition in 2018, with her final World Cup start being in a slalom in Ofterschwang, which she raced whilst wearing a bright pink dress.

Michaela Kirchgasser married Sebastian Kirchgasser on 7 May 2016 - despite having the same last name they are not related.

World Cup results

Season standings

Standings through 4 February 2018

Race podiums
 3 wins – (1 GS, 2 SL)
 17 podiums – (5 GS, 3 SL, 7 AC, 2 PSL)

World Championship results

Olympic results

References

External links

Michaela Kirchgasser World Cup standings at the International Ski Federation

 
Michaela Kirchgasser at Austrian Ski team (ÖSV) 
Michaela Kirchgasser at Atomic Skis

1985 births
Austrian female alpine skiers
Alpine skiers at the 2006 Winter Olympics
Alpine skiers at the 2010 Winter Olympics
Alpine skiers at the 2014 Winter Olympics
Olympic alpine skiers of Austria
People from St. Johann im Pongau District
Living people
Sportspeople from Salzburg (state)
21st-century Austrian women